The Sandpiper mine is a Namibian planned mining development located  south-west off the coast of the harbour town of Walvis Bay. Sandpiper represents one of the largest phosphate reserves in Namibia, having estimated reserves of 1.82 billion tonnes of ore grading 19.5% P2O5. Although phosphate mining is controversial in Namibia because of its potential impact on the fishing industry, the mining license was granted in 2011.

The mine is owned by Namibian Marine Phosphate, a subsidiary of Mawarid Mining LLC which is owned by Omani billionaire Mohammed Al Barwani.

References 

Phosphate mines in Namibia
2011 establishments in Namibia